Alpha Plus may refer to:

 A term from the 1932 novel Brave New World
 Alpha Plus Group, a UK education company